Lewis McGee may refer to:
 Lewis McGee (soldier), Australian soldier
 Lewis Allen McGee, Unitarian minister and activist